Carlia peronii is a species of skink in the genus Carlia. It is native to Timor in Indonesia.

References

Carlia
Reptiles described in 1839
Endemic fauna of Indonesia
Reptiles of Indonesia
Taxa named by André Marie Constant Duméril
Taxa named by Gabriel Bibron